Chicken eggs are graded by size, for the purpose of sales.  The egg shell constitutes 8–9% of the weight of the egg (calculated from data in Table 2, F. H. Harms)

Animal welfare 

According to Tom Vasey, chair of the British Free Range Producers' Association, laying larger eggs is painful for the hen.  He recommends shoppers only to buy eggs of medium or smaller sizes.  Professor Christine Nicol of the University of Bristol has stated 'There is no strong evidence of pain in egg-laying hens but it's not unreasonable to think there may be a mismatch in the size of birds and the eggs they produce. We do often spot bloodstains on large eggs.'

United States 

The United States Department of Agriculture sizing is based by weight per dozen. The most common U.S. size of chicken egg is 'Large' and is the egg size commonly referred to for recipes.

The following egg masses including shell have been calculated on the basis of the USDA sizing per dozen:

Canada 

In Canada, modern egg sizes are defined as follows:

Europe

In Europe, modern egg sizes are defined as follows.

Post-Soviet countries 
In countries which are members of Interstate Council for Standardization, Metrology and Certification: Russia, Belarus, Moldova, Kazakhstan, Azerbaijan, Armenia, Kyrgyzstan, Uzbekistan, Tajikistan, Georgia, and Turkmenistan eggs are sorted into five categories by mass:

Australia 

In Australia, the Australian Egg Corporation defines the following sizes in its labeling guide.

New Zealand 

In New Zealand, sizes are based on the minimum mass per egg. Current sizing introduced in 1973; prior to 1973, sizes were based on the minimum mass per dozen eggs in ounces: 15 (now 4), 18 (now 5), 22 (now 6) and 26 (now 7).

Brazil 

In Brazil sizes are based on the mass. :

Thailand 

In Thailand sizes are based on minimum mass per egg.

Japan 

In Japan, the Japan Egg Association lists the following sizes:

References 

Chicken egg sizes
Mechanical standards